Horsley railway station is located in the village of East Horsley in Surrey, England.

The station is managed by South Western Railway, who provide the majority of train services; Southern also provide some peak period services.
It is situated on the New Guildford Line between London (to the northeast) and Guildford (to the southwest) via Cobham, although some trains operate via  rather than Cobham.

History
They opened on 2 February 1885. One of the stations between Effingham Junction and Guildford which opened the same day was Horsley and Ockham and Ripley; the name was simplified to Horsley in December 1914, but some timetables showed it as "Horsley for East Horsley, West Horsley, Ockham and Ripley".

Services
All services at Horsley are operated by South Western Railway using  EMUs.

The typical off-peak service in trains per hour is:
 3 tph to 

Additional services run via Epsom during the peak hours, increasing the service to 4 tph in each direction.

On television
Horsley station doubled as Middleton station in the 1990s BBC1 show Pie in the Sky and appeared briefly in the 1984 spy thriller The Jigsaw Man with Michael Caine and Laurence Olivier.

Accidents and incidents 
 On 4 January 2019, a 51-year-old male passenger was fatally stabbed on board a South Western Railway service from Guildford to London Waterloo, as it was travelling between London Road and Clandon stations in Surrey. The train was stopped at Horsley to allow emergency services to deal with the incident. The station was closed and cordoned off by the emergency services as a result, to allow a murder inquiry to take place. The suspect in the stabbing, Darren Pencille, left the train at Clandon and was arrested the following day; he was found guilty of murder and sentenced to life imprisonment.

References

External links

Railway stations in Surrey
Former London and South Western Railway stations
Railway stations in Great Britain opened in 1885
Railway stations served by South Western Railway